George Norlin (April 1, 1871 – March 31, 1942) was president of the University of Colorado. During his tenure as president, Norlin oversaw the redesign of the campus in Boulder, Colorado.

Biography
Norlin was born in Concordia, in Cloud County, Kansas, the son of Swedish immigrant parents. He was educated at Hastings College and at the University of Chicago. He also attended the Sorbonne in Paris. Professor Norlin taught Greek language and literature at the  University of Colorado from 1899 to 1917.  He was named acting president of the  University of Colorado at Boulder in 1917. By appointment of Columbia University, Norlin spent the 1932-33 year as Theodore Roosevelt Professor of American Life and Institutions at the University of Berlin. After his time in Germany, he spoke and wrote articles warning of the dangers of Nazism and anti Semitism. He was a Weil Lecturer at the University of North Carolina (1934) and was also a trustee of the Carnegie Foundation for the Advancement of Teaching. 

During his tenure as President of the  University of Colorado, he oversaw the redesign of the Boulder campus under the plans of noted architect, Charles Zeller Klauder. Norlin is also remembered for resisting efforts by the Ku Klux Klan, which had taken control of the Colorado legislature in about 1922. The Klan insisted he dismiss all Catholic and Jewish faculty, but he resisted and guided the University through the years until 1926, when the Klan lost control of the legislature and governorship. During that period the University subsisted on a millage built into the state constitution; its budget was cut to zero.
	
Norlin died in Boulder. Norlin Library, located in the Norlin Quadrangle of the University of Colorado, was named in his honor. The University of Colorado at Boulder offers the Norlin Scholars Program for highly motivated students with excellent academic or creative ability. The George Norlin Award at the University of Colorado honors alumni of the University for distinguished lifetime achievement.

Selected works
 Fascism and Citizenship (Chapel Hill: The University of North Carolina Press, 1934)
Integrity in Education and Other Papers  (New York: The Macmillan Co., 1926)
Isocrates in 3 volumes in Loeb Classical Library (Cambridge, Massachusetts: Harvard University Press): only Vol. 1 (1928) and Vol. 2 (1929); Vol. 3 published by Larue van Hook
An Odious Comparison ( Phi Beta Kappa Addresses,  Columbia, Mo., 1917)
The Quest of American Life (Boulder, Colo: University of Colorado, 1945)
Things in the Saddle: Selected Essays and Addresses by George Norlin  (Cambridge, Massachusetts: Harvard University Press, 1940)

References

Other sources
 Benson, Adolph B.; Naboth Hedin Swedes In America (New York: Haskel House Publishers. 1969)
Ellsworth, Ralph E. (editor) A Voice from Colorado's past for the present : selected writings of George Norlin (Boulder, Colo. : Colorado Associated University Press, c1985)

External links
 
 
Norlin Library
Norlin Quadrangle
George Norlin Award
Norlin Scholars Program

Leaders of the University of Colorado Boulder
American people of Swedish descent
1871 births
1942 deaths
University of Chicago alumni
People from Concordia, Kansas